The Naked Island is a 1952 memoir by Russell Braddon about his time as a prisoner of war in Changi, Singapore during World War II. It sold over two million copies and has come to be regarded as a classic of Australian literature. It was also adapted into a play and led to a sequel.

References

Australian memoirs